is a Japanese storyboard artist, screenwriter, and director.

Filmography

Director
 Mobile Suit SD Gundam's Counterattack (1989; director)
 The Brave Express Might Gaine (1993; director as )
 Brave Police J-Decker (1994; director, episode storyboard, episode director)
 The Brave of Gold Goldran (1995; director, episode storyboard, episode director)  
 Mobile Suit Gundam Wing (1995; director [uncredited] from ep. 27 to ep. 49), episode storyboard) 
 After War Gundam X (1996; director, episode storyboard)
 Kochira Katsushika-ku Kameari Kōen-mae Hashutsujo (1998; director from ep. 76 to ep. 338)
 Kochira Katsushika-ku Kameari Kōen-mae Hashutsujo The Movie (1999; director)
 Kochira Katsushika-ku Kameari Kōen-mae Hashutsujo The Movie 2: UFO Shūrai! Tornado Daisakusen!! (2003; director)
 School Rumble (2004; director, episode storyboard, episode director)
 Gin Tama OVA (2005; director)
 Ginban Kaleidoscope (2005; director, episode storyboard; as )
 School Rumble: Extra Class (2005; director, episode storyboard, episode director)
 Gin Tama (2006; director from ep. 1 to 105; surpervisor from ep. 106 to 201)
 School Rumble: Third Semester (2008; director)
 Sora no Manimani (2009; director, writer, episode storyboard)
 Gintama: The Movie (2010; director) — Prugio Citizen's Choice Award at the Puchon International Fantastic Film Festival
 Gintama' (2011; supervisor, recording production)
 Daily Lives of High School Boys (2012; director, writer, episode storyboard, sound director)
 Chō Soku Henkei Gyrozetter (2012, chief director, episode storyboard)
 Ixion Saga DT (2012, director, episode storyboard, sound director)
 Cute High Earth Defense Club LOVE! (2015; director, episode storyboard, episode director)
 Haven't You Heard? I'm Sakamoto (2016; director, writer, episode storyboard, sound director)
 Cute High Earth Defense Club LOVE! LOVE! (2016; director)
 Nanbaka (2016; director)
 Cute High Earth Defense Club LOVE! LOVE! LOVE! OVA (2017; director)
 Cute High Earth Defense Club HAPPY KISS! (2018; director, writer, episode storyboard, sound director)
 Grand Blue (2018; director, writer, episode storyboard, episode director, sound director)
 RobiHachi (2019, director, storyboard, sound director)
 Teppen!!!!!!!!!!!!!!! Laughing 'til You Cry (2022, chief director)

Other
 Mobile Suit Zeta Gundam (1985; episode director; as )
 Mobile Suit Gundam ZZ (1986; episode storyboard, episode director)
 Deat Heat (1987; episode director)
 Dirty Pair OVA (1987; episode storyboard, episode director)
 Metal Armor Dragonar (1987; episode storyboard)
 Armor Hunter Mellowlink (1988; episode storyboard, episode director)
 Mobile Suit Gundam: Char's Counterattack (1998; co-producer)
 Ronin Warriors (1988; opening and ending coordinator; episode storyboard, episode director)
 Mobile Suit Gundam 0080: War in the Pocket (1989; episode storyboard, episode director)
 Patlabor: The TV Series (1989; episode storyboard, episode director)
 Brave Exkaiser (1990; episode storyboard, episode director)
 Chibi Maruko-chan (1990; episode storyboard, episode director)
 Mobile Suit SD Gundam OVA (1990; episode storyboard, episode director)
 The Brave Fighter of Sun Fighbird (1991; episode storyboard, episode director)
 The Brave Fighter of Legend Da-Garn (1992; production chief; episode storyboard, episode director)
 Salad Jūyūshi Tomatoman (1992; episode storyboard, episode director)
 The King of Braves GaoGaiGar (1996; episode storyboard as "Tesaki Okuno")
 Ginga Hyōryū Vifam 13 (1998; episode storyboard, episode director)
 Japan Hikarian Railroad (1998; episode storyboard)
 Outlaw Star (1998; episode storyboard)
 Yu-Gi-Oh! Duel Monsters (2000; episode storyboard)
 Brigadoon: Marin & Melan (2001; episode storyboard)
 s-CRY-ed (2001; episode storyboard)
 Lightning Attack Express (2002; episode storyboard)
 AM Driver (2004; episode storyboard; as "Tesaki Okuno")
 Gintama: The Movie: The Final Chapter: Be Forever Yorozuya (2013; supervisor, recording production)

References

External links

1961 births
Anime directors
Japanese animators
Japanese animated film directors
Japanese television directors
Japanese screenwriters
Japanese storyboard artists
Japanese voice directors
Living people
People from Tochigi Prefecture
Sunrise (company) people